Tiny Harts School is a  private high school situated in the valley of Srinagar, Jammu and Kashmir. It is a coeducational school recognised by the J&K State Board of School Education. The School was established in the early 1990s by Mrs. Hart. Classes range from LKG to X.

Initially it was located at Raj Bagh, Srinagar, Jammu and Kashmir. Later it shifted to Tengpora, Bye Pass, Srinagar.

It is an English medium school. Mostly English language is used in teacher-student interaction and even student-student interaction.

Over the past few years Tiny Harts School has raised its profile in sports. The cricket and football teams from the school have played in several tournaments and the school organizes cross country runs and trekking.

The motto of the school is "Build ye High Build Ye True".

Schools in Srinagar
Educational institutions in India with year of establishment missing